The Gods of Atlantis (titled Atlantis God in the US) is an archaeological adventure novel by New York Times and London Sunday Times bestselling author David Gibbins. First published in 2011, it is the sixth book in Gibbins' Jack Howard series.

Publication history

The book was published in the UK in hardback on 18 August 2011 and in paperback and as an ebook on 27 October 2011; the US edition (Atlantis God) was published in 2012, along with French, Greek and other translations.

Plot summary
A lost Nazi bunker in a forest in Germany contains a dreadful secret. Marine archaeologist Jack Howard returns to the lost island of Atlantis in the Black Sea to answer questions about the Atlantis priests that have plagued him. Then by tracking down the 1930s expeditions of Himmler's Ahnenerbe - the Nazi's Department of Cultural Heritage - and its link with Atlantis, Jack realises he is not just on the trail of the greatest lost relics from the past.

See also
David Gibbins

External links
 David Gibbins' website
 The Gods of Atlantis' Greek page

2011 British novels
British adventure novels
British thriller novels
Atlantis in fiction
Archaeology in popular culture
Black Sea in fiction
Headline Publishing Group books